David Quinn may refer to:

 David Quinn (actor), American actor who became a teacher and co-founder of Allrecipes
 David Quinn (artist, born 1970), Irish artist
 David Quinn (bird artist) (born 1959), British bird artist
 David Quinn (columnist), Irish commentator on religious and social affairs
 David Quinn (ice hockey) (born 1966), ice hockey coach and former player
 David Quinn (visual artist) (born 1971), Irish artist and painter
 David Quinn (writer), writer of comics
 David Beers Quinn (1909–2002), Irish historian